Florence station is a train station in Florence, South Carolina, United States served by Amtrak. It is currently served by the Palmetto and Silver Meteor routes, and is a service stop for the Auto Train.

The station site contains two buildings. The original station, built by the Atlantic Coast Line Railroad in 1910, is currently the McLeod Regional Medical Center. The previous station served as a junction between the Wilmington and Manchester Railroad,  the Northeastern Railroad, the Cheraw and Darlington Railroad (all three of which were acquired by ACL) and the South Carolina Western Railway (which became part of the Seaboard Air Line Railroad). The current station was built in 1996.

References

External links

Florence Amtrak Station (USA Rail Guide – TrainWeb)

Amtrak stations in South Carolina
Railway stations in the United States opened in 1910
Buildings and structures in Florence, South Carolina
Transportation in Florence County, South Carolina
Former Atlantic Coast Line Railroad stations